Roger Galera Flores (born 17 August 1978), or simply Roger, is a Brazilian football pundit for TV Globo and retired footballer who played as an attacking midfielder.

He was a talented left-footed player who excelled with his dribbling, technique, passing range and strong shot.

Career 
Born in Rio de Janeiro to a Brazilian father and a Trinidadian mother, Roger started his professional career with Fluminense under coach Carlos Alberto Parreira in 1999. He was the main player in the team's Brazilian Série C winning campaign, and was the symbol of the restructuring of the club. Parreira once compared him to Diego Maradona, for having a similar style. After a relatively successful campaign in the regular series for 2000, in which the team ultimately finished 10th in points, Roger was involved in a discussion at halftime in the 2nd leg quarter-final playoff game against São Caetano at the Maracanã, presumably because he was subbed off the field, and left the stadium. Fluminense ended up losing that game and being eliminated from the playoffs. They did, however, get to stay in the Serie A for 2001 with their 10th place finish in the João Havelange regular series.

In 2004 Roger played for Brazil, in a friendly match against Haiti. He scored two goals as Brazil won 6–0. He also played for the Brazil U-23 team in the 2000 Olympics football tournament. Roger was also eligible for the Trinidad and Tobago national football team.

Roger was transferred to the Portuguese club Benfica for a brief six-month period in 2001 for a reported US$6 million. However, he did not adjust and returned to Fluminense (on loan) only 6 months after the transaction. Roger returned to Benfica in 2002. In 2004, Roger returned to Fluminense once again but did not play as well as the previous years.

In 2005, Roger was acquired by Corinthians for a reported US$7 million. In late October 2005, he broke his leg in a 1–1 tie with Vasco da Gama which knocked him out for the rest of the Championship.  He has since recovered from the injury and has been playing again since January 2006.

On 13 July 2007, CR Flamengo signed the player on a six-month loan contract.

On 17 January 2008, Roger signed a contract with Grêmio Football Porto Alegrense. In July, Roger signed a contract with Qatar Sports Club, and left Grêmio.

On 4 February 2010, Roger left the Middle East and signed a contract with Cruzeiro to play Copa Libertadores football.

Nicknames 
During his stint in Corinthians Roger received the nickname "Chinelinho" for missing an excessive number of matches due to injuries. He stated almost having participated in Havaianas ads as a playful response.

Honours

Club 
Fluminense
 Taça Rio 1998
 Brazilian League – Serie C 1999
 Campeonato Carioca 2002

Benfica
 Taça de Portugal: 2003–04
 Supertaça de Portugal 2005

Corinthians
 Brazilian League 2005

Cruzeiro
 Campeonato Mineiro: 2011

Individual 
 Bola de Prata: 2001
 Campeonato Brasileiro Série A Team of the Year: 2005

References

External links 
 Roger at CBF  
 
 Flamengo anuncia a contratação de Roger, ex-Flu e Corinthians 
 Roger at Lancenet 
 Chegada de Roger ao Grêmio anima técnico Vagner Mancini 

1978 births
Living people
Brazilian footballers
Brazil international footballers
Brazilian expatriate footballers
Olympic footballers of Brazil
Footballers at the 2000 Summer Olympics
Fluminense FC players
S.L. Benfica footballers
Sport Club Corinthians Paulista players
CR Flamengo footballers
Grêmio Foot-Ball Porto Alegrense players
Qatar SC players
Al-Sailiya SC players
Cruzeiro Esporte Clube players
Expatriate footballers in Portugal
Expatriate footballers in Qatar
Campeonato Brasileiro Série A players
Association football midfielders
Footballers from Rio de Janeiro (city)